This list comprises Toyota's manufacturing facilities worldwide, as well as others that are jointly owned by the company or run under a contract.

Toyota manufacturing facilities

Asia

Japan
There are a total of sixteen Toyota-owned factories in Japan. All but three of these are located in or near Toyota City, while the others are located in Kyushu, Hokkaido and northern Honshu.

Indonesia
Toyota Motor Manufacturing Indonesia (TMMIN), Karawang, West Java
Plant 1 – Innova, Fortuner 
Plant 2 – Calya, Avanza, Veloz, Yaris
Plant 3 – Engines

Philippines
 Toyota Motor Philippines Corporation (TMPC), Santa Rosa, Laguna – Innova, Vios

Thailand
 Toyota Motor Thailand (TMT)
 Toyota Gateway plant, Hua Samrong, Chachoengsao – Yaris AC100 sedan, Yaris XP150 hatchback, Camry, C-HR, Corolla Altis, Corolla Cross
 Toyota Samrong plant, Samrong Tai, Samut Prakan – Hilux (mostly domestic models), Fortuner 
 Toyota Ban Pho plant, Lad Kwang, Chachoengsao – Hilux (export models only)
 Siam Toyota Manufacturing Co., Ltd., Chonburi – Engines
 Toyota Auto Works
 Theparak plant,  Samut Prakan — HiAce, Commuter

Vietnam
 Toyota Motor Vietnam, Phúc Yên, Vĩnh Phúc – Fortuner, Innova, Vios, Veloz Cross, Avanza Premio

Europe

France
 Toyota Motor Manufacturing France (TMMF), Onnaing-Valenciennes – Yaris XP210 / Mazda2 Hybrid, Yaris Cross

Belgium
 Brussels – European R&D facility since 1987. Similar facilities were opened in Germany (1993) and France (2000)

Czech Republic
 Toyota Motor Manufacturing Czech Republic (TMMCZ) (former joint venture with PSA Peugeot Citroën), Kolín, Czech Republic – Aygo X, Yaris XP210

Poland
 Toyota Motor Manufacturing Poland (TMMP) Sp. z o.o., Wałbrzych - Engines (both gasoline and diesel), semi-automatic and manual gear shifts and crankshafts.

Russian Federation
 OOO Sollers-Bussan, Vladivostok – Land Cruiser Prado (defunct 2022)

Turkey
 Toyota Motor Manufacturing Turkey (TMMT), Arifiye, Sakarya Province – C-HR and Corolla saloon

United Kingdom
 Toyota Manufacturing UK (TMUK)
Burnaston, Derbyshire – Corolla hatchback and estate/Suzuki Swace
Deeside, North Wales - Engines

North America

South America

Argentina
 Toyota Argentina (TASA), Zárate, Buenos Aires Province – Hilux and SW4. Production started in 1997.

Brazil
 Toyota do Brasil Ltda.
São Bernardo do Campo, São Paulo – Corolla & Hilux parts. Production of Land Cruiser Bandeirantes started in 1958 (first plant outside Japan). Vehicle production ended in 2001. To be shut down in 2023.
Indaiatuba, São Paulo – Corolla, Corolla Cross. Production started in 1998.
Sorocaba, São Paulo – Etios, Yaris XP150. Started in 2012.
Porto Feliz, São Paulo – Engines plant.

Venezuela
 Toyota de Venezuela, C.A (TDV), Cumana, Sucre State. This Plant located in the northeast of Venezuela, produces Toyota Corolla, Toyota Hilux, Toyota Fortuner and Daihatsu Terios. Previously a large maker of Land Cruiser 40, 50, 60, 70 and 80 series, and 4Runner.

Africa

South Africa
Toyota South Africa Motors (TSAM) – Prospecton, Durban – Corolla, Corolla Cross, Fortuner, Quantum, Hilux and an assortment of Hino Trucks. Assembly began in 1962, by Motor Assemblies who also built Volvos and Ramblers. Their Durban plant was opened in 1970, but they had been assembled for several years already. The Stout was the first Toyota available in South Africa, beginning in 1961.

Joint venture, licensed, and contract factories

Austria 

 Magna Steyr, Graz, Styria – Supra

France
 Stellantis Plant, Valenciennes-Hordain – ProAce

China
FAW Toyota
Tianjin – Allion, Avalon, Corolla, Corolla Cross, IZOA, Vios, Harrier
Sichuan – Coaster, Land Cruiser Prado
Changchun – RAV4
GAC Toyota, Guangzhou – Camry, C-HR, Frontlander, Highlander, Levin, Levin GT, Sienna, Venza, Wildlander, Yaris XP150

Colombia
PRACO Didacol – Since 2005, the plant only produces Hino trucks.

India
 Toyota Kirloskar Motor (TKM), Bidadi, Karnataka
 Plant 1 – Innova, Fortuner, Hilux
 Plant 2 – Camry, Urban Cruiser / Suzuki Grand Vitara
Maruti Suzuki – Belta, Rumion, Vitz
Suzuki Motor Gujarat – Glanza/Starlet

Indonesia 

 Astra Daihatsu Motor (ADM)
Sunter, Jakarta – Avanza, Rush, Town Ace / Lite Ace
Karawang, West Java – Agya/Wigo, Avanza, Calya, Raize, Rush

Japan 

 Subaru Corporation, Ōta, Gunma – GR86

Malaysia 

 UMW Toyota Motor
 Assembly Services Sdn. Bhd., Shah Alam, Selangor – Fortuner, Hilux, Innova
 UMW Toyota Motor, Bukit Raja, Selangor – Corolla Cross, Vios, Yaris XP150
Perodua Manufacturing – Rush, Veloz

Pakistan 

Indus Motors Company, Karachi – Corolla, Fortuner, Hiace, Hilux, Yaris XP150

Spain
 Stellantis Plant, Vigo – ProAce City

Taiwan
 Kuozui Motors – Camry, Corolla Altis, Corolla Cross, Sienta, Town Ace Truck, Vios, Yaris XP150
 Hotai Motor – C-HR, Land Cruiser Prado, Sienna

United States 

Mazda Toyota Manufacturing USA, Huntsville, Alabama – Corolla Cross

Hino Motors
 Ontario, California (2004) – Toyota components and Hino trucks
 Marion, Arkansas (2006) – Differential, rear axle and suspension related parts
 Mineral Wells, West Virginia (2018) – Class 6, 7, 8 trucks
 Williamstown, West Virginia (2007) – Class 6, 7 trucks
 Woodstock, Ontario (2006) – Class 6, 7 trucks
 Guanajuato, Mexico (2009) – 500 series trucks with partner Mitsui

Former joint venture, licensed, and Toyota factories

Australia
 Altona, Victoria (1963–2017) – Corolla, Aurion, Avalon, Camry
Holden/United Australian Automobile Industries (1987–1996) – Lexcen

Colombia
SOFASA, Envigado (1996–2009, contract facility) – Land Cruiser, Hilux

Ghana
 Toyota Industries, Accra (contract facility) – Vitz/Yaris, RAV4

New Zealand

 Christchurch plant and two others, Sockburn (1980–1996)

Russian Federation
 Toyota Motor Manufacturing Russia (TMMR), Saint Petersburg – Camry, RAV4 (2005–2022)

United States
 Subaru of Indiana Automotive, Inc., Lafayette, Indiana (2007–2016, contract facility) – Camry
 New United Motor Manufacturing, Inc., Fremont, California, (1984–2010, 50% joint venture with General Motors) – Corolla, Tacoma

Zimbabwe
 Toyota Kirloskar Motor Private Limited, Harare – Corolla, Innova, Fortuner

References

Toyota
 
Lists of motor vehicle assembly plants